Erol Güngör (November 25, 1938 in Kırşehir – April 24, 1983 in Istanbul) was a Turkish sociologist, psychologist, and writer.

Career
After spending a period in the Faculty of Law, Güngör graduated from the Faculty of Literature and Social Sciences of Istanbul University in 1961. He received his Ph.D. in 1965 with a  thesis titled "Kelâmî (Verbal) Yapılarda Estetik Organizasyon". Kenneth Hammond invited him to visit the University of Colorado. He became an associate professor with his thesis titled "Şahıslar arası Ihtilafların Çözümünde Lisanın Rolü" in 1970. He became an academic in the Faculty of Literature and Social Sciences of Istanbul University in 1975. He eventually became the president of Selçuk University in 1982.

He mostly studied culture, personality, customs, people and religion. He focused on the identity and cultural problems which Turkish people have faced in the last 150 years.

Works
Some of his works are:
 Ahlak Psikolojisi ve Sosyal Ahlak (Ötüken Neşriyat, Istanbul, 2000)
 Dünden Bugüne Tarih Kültür ve Milliyetçilik (Ötüken Neşriyat, Istanbul, 2005)
 Islam'ın Bugünkü Meseleleri (Ötüken Neşriyat, Istanbul, 2005)
 Islam Tasavvufunun Meseleleri (Ötüken Neşriyat, Istanbul, 2004)
 Kültür Değişmesi ve Milliyetçilik (Ötüken Neşriyat, Istanbul, 2003)
 Sosyal Meseleler ve Aydınlar (Ötüken Neşriyat, Istanbul, 2003)
 Türk Kültürü ve Milliyetçilik (Ötüken Neşriyat, Istanbul, 2004)
 Türkiye'de Misyoner Faaliyetleri (Ötüken Neşriyat,  Istanbul, 2005)
 Tarihte Türkler (Ötüken Neşriyat, Istanbul, 2006)
 Kelâmî Sahada Estetik Yapı Organizasyonu (Ötüken Neşriyat, Istanbul, 1999)
 Şahıslar Arası Ihtilafların Çözümünde Lisanın Yönü (Ötüken Neşriyat, Istanbul, 1998)
 Değerler Psikolojisi Üzerine Araştırmalar (Ötüken Neşriyat, Istanbul, 1998)

References

1938 births
1983 deaths
Turkish non-fiction writers
Academic staff of Istanbul University
Turkish sociologists
Turkish psychologists
Academic staff of Selçuk University
Istanbul University Faculty of Law alumni
20th-century psychologists
20th-century non-fiction writers